The following is an on stage and screen filmography of the English actor Sir Patrick Stewart  (born 13 July 1940).

Stewart has had a prolific career spanning over 60 years, and he has been nominated for the Laurence Olivier, Golden Globe, Emmy, Screen Actors Guild, Saturn, and Tony Awards.

Film

Television

Video games

Stage

References

Stewart, Patrick